"DJ" is a CD single by popular Greek artist Marianta Pieridi released in Greece in October 2006 by Universal Music Greece.

Track listing
 "DJ (Stanna Eller Go)"
 "Mono An Isoun Trelos (Anlayamatin)"
 "Parte Ton"
 "DJ (Bobeatz Mix)"

References

2006 singles
Greek-language songs
Mariada Pieridi songs
Polydor Records singles
2006 songs